Xavier Chalier (born 13 June 1974) is a retired French football striker.

References

1974 births
Living people
French footballers
AJ Auxerre players
Amiens SC players
Wasquehal Football players
Stade Poitevin FC players
Ligue 1 players
Ligue 2 players
Association football forwards